The Swan 411 was designed by Olin Stephens and built by Nautor's Swan and first launched in 1977.

References

External links
 http://www.nautorswan.com Nautor Swan
 http://www.classicswan.org/swan_411.php

Sailing yachts
Keelboats
Swan 43
Swan 43
Swan 43
Swan 43